In enzymology, a glutarate-semialdehyde dehydrogenase is an enzyme that catalyzes the chemical reaction

glutarate semialdehyde + NAD+ + H2O  glutarate + NADH + 2 H+

The 3 substrates of this enzyme are glutarate semialdehyde, NAD+, and H2O, whereas its 3 products are glutarate, NADH, and H+.

This enzyme belongs to the family of oxidoreductases, specifically those acting on the aldehyde or oxo group of donor with NAD+ or NADP+ as acceptor.  The systematic name of this enzyme class is glutarate-semialdehyde:NAD+ oxidoreductase. This enzyme is also called glutarate semialdehyde dehydrogenase.  This enzyme participates in lysine degradation.

References 

 

EC 1.2.1
NADH-dependent enzymes
Enzymes of unknown structure